Football Club Drita, commonly known as Drita, is a professional football club based in Gjilan, Kosovo. The club plays in the Football Superleague of Kosovo .

The club's home ground is the Gjilan City Stadium. It was built in 1947 when the club played within the Yugoslav league system. However, from 1990 until the end of the Kosovo War, the club split in two different clubs with one team staying as the official club, playing in the home stadium and league system.

History
In 1947, Drita was founded by the Gjilan citizens, the name Drita means 'light' in Albanian and the name was taken from other sports clubs from the city. In the beginning, conditions were difficult, even more so because the team rivaled the other team of the city, Crvena zvezda Gnjilane. Contrary to them, Drita founders and footballers were exclusively Albanians. This insistence in nationalistic differentiation meant that, in 1952 the team was abolished by the regime. Former footballers went to the already multi-ethnic team of Zvezda, but the team didn't get erased completely. They competed in the Kosovo Province League where they were declared champions in the 1962–63 season.

Post-1990
In 1991.  At the time of the dissolution of Yugoslavia. the football of Kosovo was in its zenith and consistently had 4-5 clubs in both federal leagues. But the deterioration of the political situation was also reflected in sports. In 1991, Albanian separatist complaining about the situation, formed the Football Federation of Kosovo with all its organs. Drita then joined the new league system in Kosovo, where they played in the fields of the mountains around the city of Gjilan.

Selami Osmani era
After the 90s, Drita was taken into management by Selami Osmani - Bezi with whom for 15 years reached the tops of Kosovan football, thanks to the players that brought in Gjilan, he who for 15 years contributed to Drita. Under his management Drita managed to adorn the title of the Kosovo championship in 2002–03, win the cup in 2000–01 and be a runner-up in 1999–2000 and 2001–02. Drita also reached the semifinals in 1999–00, 2001–02 and 2002–03, breaking a Kosovo record that for four consecutive years did not descend below the third position and for four years at least until the semifinals of the Kosovar Cup.

Valon Murseli and Flamur Bunjaku era
On 21 July 2016, Valon Murseli and Flamur Bunjaku took over the club, the two businessmen promised big things to the club, where in 2017–18 they relied on them, proclaiming champions for kampione kampione olle olle olle kampione kampione olle olle the second time in the club's history.

Ardian Nuhiu era
In 2020 after the sacking of the previous coach , Ardian Nuhiu was appointed first team manager. He won the league in the season 2019-20 after he beat SCGj

Support

Drita in the 1997–98 championship was great wherever in Kosovo and in many sporting games, the meetings started but it was difficult to name the fans. The Ballkani and Drita match was a tough game because Ballkani fought for the survival and Drita for champion, so the fans traveled to Suva Reka for the last time without a name after this game, before the game against biggest rival Gjilani, the board succumbed and after many debates the name  was assigned because most of the players except they played were also writers, poets, politicians and so on.

The Intellectuals are the biggest ultras group in Kosovo, with many transfers outside Gjilan. They also have the record of audience in football of Kosovo, the biggest was against Gjilani in 2011 with 13,000 fans and they traveled also in 2002 with 30,000 fans to the final of the Kosovar Cup in the Fadil Vokrri Stadium.

Incidents
Also at  there are groups of hooligans who do incidents especially during the derby towards Gjilani.

Club rivalries

Gjilani

There is often a fierce rivalry between the two strongest teams in a national league and this is particularly the case in the Football Superleague of Kosovo, where the game between Drita and Gjilani is known as the Kosovo Derby.

One hour before the match, the two camps are organized in groups and always avoid eventual incidents between the two ultras groups. They divide the streets from where they will go to the stadium, which is good, because the Kosovo Police organised themselves in a way to avoid the breakdown of this holiday and the much anticipated confrontation in Gjilan.

For a brief few moments, everything apart from the dozens of flares that littered the pitch, that'd had disappeared from view. Gone were the two white minarets that usually overlook the stadium in eastern Kosovo. Gone too were the lines of riot police patrolling the front of the main stand along with the 10,000 strong crowd, all enveloped in a monstrous blue cloud of smoke. On the other side of the pitch, a similar scene was being played out, but the consuming cloud was red. The only evidence of a football match being played was the thunderous noise of drums and chants rising ethereally from the fog.

Records and statistics
Drita in the 2017–18 season has not suffered any losses, so it has broken its record since 2002–03 season with 30 undefeated games.

Kit evolution
After the war, the financial condition of clubs did not allow them to look after their kits, it happened that within a season the club's shirts have changed. But since joining UEFA and FIFA, this problem has disappeared. During the presentation of Betim Haxhimusa, they also unveiled the new kits that would be worn in the 2018–19 season, while the traditional colors are interwoven in a design inspired by the famous sportswear brand Givova. While in the UEFA Champions League match against Malmö in Sweden, Drita played with their third kits making the presentation in public for the first time.

Period

Stadium

The club has played its home games at the Gjilan City Stadium is a multi-purpose stadium in Gjilan, Kosovo. The stadium has a capacity of 10,000 people all seater. Since 2017, the stadium is under renovation as it does not meet any level required by UEFA and the goal is to get the stadium to become a fourth-tier UEFA stadium.

Honours

Players

Current squad

Academy players with first-team appearances

Personnel

List of the managers
Below is a list of Drita managers from 1999, until the present day.

  (1999–2000)
  (1999–2000)
  (2000–01)
  (2001–02)
  (2001–02)
  (2002 as caretaker)
  (2002–03)
  (2003 as caretaker)
  (2003–04)
  (2007 as caretaker)
  (2007–08)
  (2008 as caretaker)
  (2008–09)
  (2011–12)
  (2012–13)
  (2013)
  (2013)
  (2013–14)
  (2014)
  (2014–15)
  (2015)
  (2015–16)
 Amir Alagić (2016)
  (2016)
  (2016–17)
  (2017–18)
  (2018–19)
  (2019–2022)

Drita in Europe
Drita competed in the UEFA Champions League for the first time in the 2018–19 season, entering at the preliminary round. On 12 June 2018, in Nyon, the draw was held and Drita were drawn against the Andorran side FC Santa Coloma. On 26 June 2018, Drita beat Santa Coloma at Victoria Stadium in Gibraltar and became the first Kosovar side to win a UEFA Champions League match.

After being eliminated from Malmö, Drita continued to play in the second qualifying round of UEFA Europa League. On 17 July 2018, Drita learns the upcoming rival which was the champion of 2017–18 Luxembourg National Division, F91 Dudelange.

By competition

Matches

UEFA club coefficient ranking

See also
Kosovo Derby

References

External links
 

 
Association football clubs established in 1947
Football clubs in Kosovo
Football clubs in Yugoslavia